The Tyne Songster is a chapbook style songbook, giving the lyrics of local, now historical songs, with a few bits of other information. It was published by W. & T. Fordyce of Newcastle upon Tyne in 1840.

Details
The Tyne Songster (full title – “The Tyne Songster – A Choice Selection of Songs in the Newcastle Dialect  – "No pompous strains, nor labour'd lines are here, But genuine mirth and sportive wit appear; Northumbria's genius, in her simple rhymes; Shall live an emblem to succeeding times – Newcastle:  – Printed and sold by W & T Fordyce – 1840) is a chapbook style book of Geordie folk songs consisting of approximately 225 song lyrics on over 300 pages, published in 1840.

The publication 
It is, as the title suggests, a collection of songs  which would have been popular, or topical, at the date of publication. There is very little in the way of biographies of any of the writers or histories of the events.

The front cover of the book was as thus :- 
THE
TYNE SONGSTER
A CHOICE SELECTION OF: 
SONGS
IN THE
Newcastle Dialect
¨¨¨¨¨¨¨¨¨¨¨¨¨¨¨¨¨¨¨¨¨¨¨¨¨¨¨¨¨¨¨¨¨¨¨¨¨¨¨¨¨¨¨¨¨¨¨
"No pompous strains, nor labour'd lines are here, 
But genuine mirth and sportive wit appear; 
Northumbria's genius, in her simple rhymes; 
Shall live an emblem to succeeding times
¨¨¨¨¨¨¨¨¨¨¨¨¨¨¨¨¨¨¨¨¨¨¨¨¨¨¨¨¨¨¨¨¨¨¨¨¨¨¨¨¨¨¨¨¨¨¨
Newcastle: 
PRINTED AND SOLD BY W. & T. FORDYCE
¨¨¨¨¨¨¨¨
1840

Contents 
Are as below :-<br/ >

<br/ >

John Simpson the pedestrian
John Simpson (lived c.1822) the pedestrian was a Cumbrian competitive walker/athlete.

Simpson was a Cumbrian character who was referenced in The Tyne Songster published in 1840, in the song "On Russell The Pedestrian". While not written in a Geordie dialect, it has a strong Northern connection. The notes to the song mention that Russell walked 101 miles in 23 hours, 56 minutes and 30 seconds on the 25 and 26 June 1822 on Newcastle Racecourse.

On Whit Monday, and again on the 29 and 30 July 1822, Simpson attempted to walk 96 miles, but failed in both attempts.

Russell the pedestrian
Russell the pedestrian, who (lived c1822) was a Newcastle character who was mentioned on page 180 by W & T Fordyce (publishers) in The Tyne Songster published in 1840, in the song "On Russell The Pedestrian" written in his honour. It is not written in a Geordie dialect, but has a strong Northern connection.

The song is a tribute to Mr Russell who walked 101 miles in 23 hours, 56 minutes and 30 seconds on the 25 and 26 June 1822 on Newcastle Racecourse.

Notes
Fr-Tune1 – according to J. P. Robson's Songs of the Bards of the Tyne (Newcastle: France,[1849]) the tune is "Bow Wow".

See also 
Geordie dialect words<br/ >
W & T Fordyce (publishers)

References

External links
 The Tyne Songster-W&T Fordyce-1840

English folk songs
Songs related to Newcastle upon Tyne
Northumbrian folklore
Chapbooks